The SUNTECH Tower (Suntech @ Penang Cybercity) is a business tower in Penang, Malaysia. The tower is the first tower to have MSC designated status. The tower will feature 22 levels (including ground floor), 240 office units (12th-21st floor) and 40 shoplots (Ground floor/1st floor). The office building is located in the Penang Cybercity in the township of Bayan Baru.

Location
Suntech is located in the heart of Bayan Baru township, a rapidly developing township with many facilities under the Penang Cybercity Phase 1.

External links
 SUNTECH @ Penang Cybercity
 Emerald Capital Group

Office buildings completed in 2008
Office buildings in Penang
Skyscraper office buildings in Malaysia
MSC Malaysia
2008 establishments in Malaysia